Ryo Tadokoro (田所 諒, born April 8, 1986) is a Japanese retired football player.

Club statistics
Updated to 23 February 2018.

References

External links

Profile at Yokohama FC

1986 births
Living people
Osaka University of Health and Sport Sciences alumni
Association football people from Osaka Prefecture
People from Neyagawa, Osaka
Japanese footballers
J2 League players
Fagiano Okayama players
Yokohama FC players
Association football midfielders